Globidrillia smirna is a species of sea snail, a marine gastropod mollusk in the family Drilliidae.

Description
The shell grows to a length of 15 mm, its diameter 3.25 mm.

(Original description) The long, slender shell shines with the lustre of barley-sugar candy. It contains 12 whorls, of which two are in the protoconch. These two are white, smooth, rather large, inflated, polished, not sculptured except by lines of growth, changing suddenly into the normal sculpture. The sculpture consisting of small pointed nodules set on the periphery of the whorls, a little in advance of midway between the sutures. They number ten to fourteen on each whorl, except the last half-whorl in the adult, where they begin to be obsolete. The tips of these nodules and a line just in advance of the suture are white as compared with the general translucent pinkish or fleshy hue. These nodules are a little compressed in the latter whorls in a direction transverse to the whorls. The lines of growth are distinct and in the later whorls occasionally a little prominent at the suture, against which the shell is appressed. There is no other transverse sculpture. The revolving sculpture is comprised in fifteen or twenty threads on the body whorl, faintly visible at the periphery and
gradually becoming stronger toward the end of the siphonal canal An occasional trace of such might be visible on some of the older whorls. The anal sulcus is moderately deep. The notch-band is not strongly marked. The outer in the adult is produced (but imperfect in our specimens), apparently having the usual form. The columella is obliquely cut off anteriorly, covered with a light callus. The siphonal canal is narrow. The aperture is short and seemingly rather wide, behind.

Distribution
This species occurs in the demersal zone of the Caribbean Sea (Cuba) and the Gulf of Mexico at depths between 699 m and 755 m.

References

 Gofas, S.; Le Renard, J.; Bouchet, P. (2001). Mollusca. in: Costello, M.J. et al. (eds), European Register of Marine Species: a check-list of the marine species in Europe and a bibliography of guides to their identification. Patrimoines Naturels. 50: 180–213.
 Rosenberg, G., F. Moretzsohn, and E. F. García. 2009. Gastropoda (Mollusca) of the Gulf of Mexico, Pp. 579–699 in Felder, D.L. and D.K. Camp (eds.), Gulf of Mexico–Origins, Waters, and Biota. Biodiversity. Texas A&M Press, College Station, Texas
  Tucker, J.K. 2004 Catalog of recent and fossil turrids (Mollusca: Gastropoda). Zootaxa 682:1–1295

External links

smirna
Gastropods described in 1881